Feminist art is a category of art associated with the late 1960s and 1970s feminist movement. Feminist art highlights the societal and political differences women experience in their lives. The hopeful gain from this form of art is to bring a positive and understanding change to the world, in hope to lead to equality or liberation. Media used range from traditional art forms such as painting to more unorthodox methods such as performance art, conceptual art, body art, craftivism, video, film, and fiber art. Feminist art has served as an innovative driving force towards expanding the definition of art through the incorporation of new media and a new perspective.

History

Historically speaking, women artists, when they existed, have largely faded into obscurity: there is no female Michelangelo or Da Vinci equivalent. In Why Have There Been No Great Women Artists Linda Nochlin wrote, "The fault lies not in our stars, our hormones, our menstrual cycles, or our empty internal spaces, but in our institutions and our education". Because of women's historical role as caregiver, most women were unable to devote time to creating art. In addition, women were rarely allowed entry into schools of art, and almost never allowed into live nude drawings classes for fear of impropriety. Women were oppressed and refrained from making a name for themselves. Therefore, women who were artists were likely either wealthy women with leisure time who were trained by their fathers or uncles and produced still lives, landscapes, or portrait work or become one of many assistants to other male artists. Examples include Anna Claypoole Peale and Mary Cassatt.

Feminist art can be contentious to define as it holds different personal and political elements, different to each individual. Is all art made by a feminist then feminist art? Can art that is not made by a feminist be feminist art? There has been misguided theories of the nature of the art.Lucy R. Lippard stated in 1980 that feminist art was "neither a style nor a movement but instead a value system, a revolutionary strategy, a way of life." Emerging at the end of the 1960s, the feminist art movement was inspired by the 1960s student protests, the civil rights movement, and Second-wave feminism. By critiquing institutions that promote sexism and racism students that are people of colour, and women were able to identify and attempt to fix inequity. Women artists used their artwork, protests, collectives, and women's art registries to shed light on inequities in the art-world. The first wave of feminist art was established in the mid 19th century. In the early 1920s, with woman gaining the right to vote in America, liberalization wave spreading through the world. The slow and gradual change in feminist art started gaining momentum in 1960s.

1960s

Before the 1960s the majority of woman-made artwork did not portray feminist content, in the sense that it neither addressed nor criticized the conditions that women have historically faced. Women were more often the subjects of art, rather than artists themselves. Historically, the female body was regarded as an object of desire existing for the pleasure of men. In the early 20th century, works that flaunted female sexuality – the pin-up girl being a prime example – began to be produced. By the late 1960s, there was a plethora of feminine artwork that broke away from the tradition of depicting women in an exclusively sexualized fashion.

In order to gain recognition, many female artists struggled to "de-gender" their work in order to compete in a dominantly male art world. If a work did not "look" like it was made by a woman, then the stigma associated with women would not cling to the work itself, thus giving the work its own integrity. In 1963 Yayoi Kusama created Oven-Pan – part of a larger collection of works she referred to as the aggregation sculptures. As with other works from that collection, Oven-Pan takes an object associated with women's work – in this case, a metal pan – and completely covers it with bulbous lumps of the same material. This is an early feminist example of female artists finding ways to break from the traditional role of women in society. Having the lumps made from the same colour and material as the metal pan completely takes away the pan's functionality, and – in a metaphorical sense – its association with women.  The protrusions remove the item's gender by not only removing its function of being a metal pan women would use in the kitchen, but by also making it ugly. Before this era, common female work consisted of pretty and decorative things like landscapes and quilts,Christa Dowling attempts to explain this theory by stating arguing that 'women are more sensitive by nature than man...'. Whereas more contemporary artwork by women was becoming bold or even rebellious, for example Suzanne Valadon.

Towards the end of the decade, progressive ideas criticizing social values began to appear in which the mainstream ideology that had come to be accepted was denounced as not being neutral. It was also suggested, that the art world as a whole had managed to institutionalise within itself the notion of sexism. During this time there was a rebirth of various media that had been placed at the bottom of the aesthetic hierarchy by art history, such as quilting. To put it simply, this rebellion against the socially constructed ideology of a woman's role in art sparked the birth of a new standard of the female subject. Where once the female body was seen as an object for the male gaze, it then became regarded as a weapon against socially constructed ideologies of gender.

With Yoko Ono's 1964 work, Cut Piece, performance art began to gain popularity in feminist artwork as a form of critical analysis on societal values on gender. In this work, Yoko Ono is seen kneeling on the ground with a pair of scissors in front of her. One by one, she invited the audience to cut a piece of her clothing off until she was eventually left kneeling in the tattered remains of her clothing and her underwear. This intimate relationship created between the subject (Ono) and the audience addressed the notion of gender in the sense that Ono has become the sexual object. By remaining motionless as more and more pieces of her clothing are cut away, she reveals a woman's social standing where she is regarded as an object as the audience escalates to the point where her bra is being cut away.

1970s
During the 1970s, feminist art continued to provide a means of challenging women's position in the social hierarchy. The aim was for women to reach a state of equilibrium with their male counterparts. Judy Chicago's work, The Dinner Party (1979), widely regarded as the first epic feminist artwork, emphasizes this idea of newfound female empowerment through the use of turning a dinner table – an association to the traditional female role – into an equilateral triangle. Each side has an equal number of plate settings dedicated to a specific woman in history. Each plate contains a dish. This served as a way of breaking the idea of women being subjugated by society. Looking at the historical context, the 1960s and 1970s served as a prominent era where women began to celebrate new forms of freedom. More women joining the workforce, legalization of birth control, fight towards equal pay, civil rights, and the Roe v. Wade (1973)  decision to legalize abortion, were reflected in the artwork. Such freedoms, however, were not limited to politics.

Traditionally, being able to expertly capture the nude on canvas or in a sculpture reflected a high level of achievement in the arts. In order to reach that level, access to nude models was required. While male artists were given this privilege, it was considered improper for a woman to see a naked body. As a result, women were forced to focus their attention to the less professionally acclaimed "decorative" art. With the 1970s, however, the fight towards equality extended to the arts. Eventually, more and more women began to enrol in art academies. For most of these artists, the goal was not to paint like the traditional male masters, but instead to learn their techniques and manipulate them in a way that challenged traditional views of women.

Mary Beth Edelson's Some Living American Women Artists / Last Supper (1972) appropriated Leonardo da Vinci’s The Last Supper, with the heads of notable women artists collaged over the heads of Christ and his apostles. This image, addressing the role of religious and art historical iconography in the subordination of women, became "one of the most iconic images of the feminist art movement."

Photography became a common medium used by feminist artists. It was used, in many ways, to show the "real" woman. For instance, in 1979 Judith Black took a self-portrait depicting her body in such a light. It showed the artist's ageing body and all her flaws in an attempt to portray herself as a human being rather than an idealized sex symbol. Hannah Wilke also used photography as her way of expressing a non-traditional representation of the female body. In her 1974 collection called S.O.S - Stratification Object Series, Wilke used herself as the subject. She portrayed herself topless with various pieces of chewed gum in the shape of vulvas arranged throughout her body, metaphorically demonstrating how women in society are chewed up and then spit out. In 1975 in Hungary, Budapest Orshi Drozdik under her birth name Drozdik Orsolya as a student at the Hungarian Academy of Fine Arts, was examining the historic 19th and early 20th-century academic document photos of nude model-settings in the academy's library. She rephotographed them and exhibited the photos as her own work. Later that year she projected the images of nude-model-settings, to her own naked body, photographed them and made performances titled NudeModel in which she exhibited herself as a woman artist drawing a female nude model.

At this time, there was a large focus on rebelling against the "traditional woman". With this came the backlash of both men and women who felt their tradition was being threatened. To go from showing women as glamorous icons to showing the disturbing silhouettes of women (an artistic demonstration of the 'imprint' left behind by the victims of rape) in the case of Ana Mendieta, underscored certain forms of degradation that popular culture failed to fully acknowledge.

While Ana Mendieta's work focused on a serious issue, other artists, like Lynda Benglis, took a more satirical stance in the fight towards equality. In one of her photographs published in Artforum, she is depicted naked with a short haircut, sunglasses, and a dildo positioned in her pubic region. Some saw this radical photo as "vulgar" and "disturbing". Others, however, saw an expression of the uneven balance between the genders in the sense that her photo was critiqued more harshly than a male counterpart, Robert Morris, who posed shirtless with chains around his neck as a sign of submission. At this time, the depiction of a dominant woman was highly criticized and in some cases, any female art depicting sexuality was perceived as pornographic.

Unlike Benglis' depiction of dominance to expose inequality in gender, Marina Abramović used subjugation as a form of exposing the position of women in a society that horrified rather than disturbed the audience. In her performance work Rhythm 0 (1974), Abramovic pushes not only her limits but her audience's limits as well, by presenting the public with 72 different objects ranging from feathers and perfume to a rifle and a bullet. Her instructions are simple; She is the object and the audience may do whatever they want with her body for the next six hours. Her audience has complete control while she lays motionless. Eventually, they become wilder and begin violating her body – at one point a man threatens her with a rifle – yet when the piece ends the audience gets into a frenzy and run away in fear as if they cannot come to terms with what just happened. In this emotional performance piece, Abramovic depicts the powerful message of the objectification of the female body while at the same time unravelling the complexity of human nature.

In 1975, Barbara Deming founded The Money for Women Fund to support the work of feminist artists. Deming helped administer the Fund, with support from artist Mary Meigs.  After Deming's death in 1984, the organization was renamed as The Barbara Deming Memorial Fund. Today, the foundation is the "oldest ongoing feminist granting agency" which "gives encouragement and grants to individual feminists in the arts (writers, and visual artists)".

1980s
Although feminist art is fundamentally any field that strives towards equality among the genders, it is not static. It is a constantly changing project that "is itself constantly shaped and remodelled in relation to the living processes of women's struggles". It is not a platform but rather a "dynamic and self-critical response". The feminist spark from the 1960s and 1970s helped to carve a path for the activist and identity art of the 1980s.  In fact, The meaning of feminist art evolved so quickly that by 1980 Lucy Lippard curated a show where "all the participants exhibited work that belonged to 'the full panorama of social-change art,' though in a variety of ways that undercut any sense that 'feminism' meant either a single political message or a single kind of artwork.  This openness was a key element to the future creative social development of feminism as a political and cultural intervention."

In 1985, the Museum of Modern Art in New York opened a gallery that claimed to exhibit the most-renowned works of contemporary art of the time. Of the 169 artists chosen, only 13 were women. As a result of this, an anonymous group of women investigated the most influential museums of art only to find out that they barely exhibited women's art. With that came the birth of the Guerrilla Girls who devoted their time to fighting sexism and racism in the art world through the use of protest, posters, artwork and public speaking. Unlike the feminist art prior to the 1980s, the Guerrilla Girls introduced a bolder more in-your-face identity and both captured attention and exposed sexism. Their posters aim to strip the role that women played in the art world prior to the feminist movement. In one case, the painting La Grande Odalisque by Jean-Auguste-Dominique Ingres was used in one of their posters where the female nude portrayed was given a gorilla mask. Beside it was written "Do women have to be naked to get into the Met. Museum? Less than 5% of the artists in the Modern Art Sections are women, but 85% of the nudes are female". By taking a famous work and remodelling it to remove its intended purpose for the male gaze, the female nude is seen as something other than a desirable object.

The critique of the male gaze and the objectification of women can also be seen in Barbara Kruger's Your gaze Hits the side of my face. In this work, we see a marble bust of a woman turned to its side. The lighting is harsh, creating sharp edges and shadows to emphasize the words "your gaze hits the side of my face" written in bold letters of black red and white down the left side of the work. In that one sentence, Kruger is able to communicate her protest on gender, society, and culture through language designed in a way that can be associated with a contemporary magazine, thus capturing the viewer's attention.

1990s
These are other works of the 1990s have been discussed alongside cyberfeminism and cyberfeminist collectives such as VNS Matrix, OBN/Old Boys Network, and subRosa. Building on earlier examples of feminist art that had incorporated technologies such as video and digital photography, feminist artists in the 1990s experimented with digital media, such as the World Wide Web, hypertext and coding, interactive art, and streaming media. Artist and feminist theorist Bracha L. Ettinger developed the idea of the Matrixial Gaze. Some works, such as Olia Lialina's My Boyfriend Came Back From The War (1996), utilized hypertext and digital images to create a non-linear narrative experience about gender, war, and trauma. Other works, such as Prema Murthy's Bindigirl (1999), combined performance art with streaming video, live chat, and a website to interrogate gender, colonialism, and online consumerism. Works such as Victoria Vesna's Bodies© INCorporated (1997) used virtual reality media such as 3D modeling and VRML to satirize the commodification of the body in digital culture.

2000s

With the development of technology and various forms of entertainment in the 21st century, feminist art has gradually penetrated into various fields. The development in music is particularly notable. In terms of Hip-Hop music, many hip-hop songs promote the art of feminism. Taking South Korea as an example, many female hip-hop singers will openly produce hip-hop songs about feminism to speak out for some unequal gender issues in society. For example, the Korean female rapper BIBI released a song called "Animal Farm" this year, which expresses women's resistance to gender discrimination against women in a patriarchal society and the issue of male coagulation by borrowing the classic footage from "Kill Bill". 1. Other works such as girl group (G)I-dle's newly released song "Nxde"; There is a line in the song "We born nude" that expresses disgust for the colored glasses that men add to women. People are born naked, so nude does not represent the meaning of pornography, all meanings are artificially added. If you think of porn when you mention nude, it can only mean that it is a dirty personal mind. This song redefines the word "Nude" to express women's courage to be themselves and not be bound by the stereotypes imposed on women in the world. There is a line in the song "We born nude" that expresses disgust for the colored glasses that men add to women. People are born naked, so nude does not represent the meaning of pornography, all meanings are artificially added. If you think of porn when you mention nude, it can only mean that it is a dirty personal mind. The comments posted by some male netizens after the song was released also confirmed the idea of the song. They reacted greatly to the topic of nude, but they were disappointed after seeing the content of the MV. The reason for this is self-evident.

Also a series of k-drama films about feminism. Such as the 2019 Korean movie, Kim Ji-young: Born 1982. The film is based on the novel of the same name. It tells the story of a woman named Kim Ji-young who suffered from postpartum depression due to some words and deeds of mother in low after pregnancy and childbirth. Her husband and his family suddenly woke up and helped Kim Ji-young find herself. In the film, it is revealed that both passers-by and family members are prejudiced against Kim Ji-young's identity as a housewife. When Kim Ji-young was playing outside with her children, a male passerby who was an office worker said that housewife was the easiest occupation. You have money to spend without doing anything. But in other shots, the hardships of the housewife profession are all revealed. Kim Ji-young wanted to return to the workplace to continue her work after giving birth, but the suppression of people around her and the stereotype of women forced her to give up this idea. This is a real film that exposes the various discriminations women face in society. Before the film was released, it was boycotted by a large group of men, who refused to accept the reality and refused to admit the real situation of women. But the film still defied the odds, showing the world what women were in. In Muraro The Symbolic of the Mother she mentions that "we need to 'will have authority with the mother in order to experience it again as a symbolic principle'" that is, women are to change the entire structure of human existing social relations; to some extent , which requires women to place themselves under the authority, guidance, and guardianship of senior women who are the mother figures who serve them, instead of mothers. Muraro's point of view is reflected in the film Kim ji-young: Born1982 Come out. Whether it is Kim Ji-young's mother or mother-in-law, she guides Kim Ji-young as a so-called senior woman. Not only South Korea, but some recent Chinese dramas also show a feminist side. The TV series called New Life Begins, which tells about machinations and love in an overhead background, is also interspersed with women who bravely resist the unreasonable system, fight for their legal rights, and help and live with each other between women. Feminism spreads in this way, and this is the development of feminist art. It is a further development of feminist art that the majority of women can accept feminism and widely publicize it through this approachable and easier-to-understand way.

Promoting feminist art
In the 1970s, society started to become open to change and people started to realize that there was a problem with the stereotypes of each gender. Feminist art became a popular way of addressing the social concerns of feminism that surfaced in the late 1960s to 1970s. Over fifty years ago, “the first feminist challenge was levied at the history of art with the publication in 1971 of Linda Nochlin’s essay Why Have There Been No Great Women Artists?” Nochlin chaired the College Art Association session in 1972 entitled “Eroticism and the Image of Women in Nineteenth Century”, a great space where feminist language and thinking influenced concepts of art history. The session discussed the ways in which “raw sexism in the creation and use of female imagery was so memorably exposed,” which called for the need of decolonization within art history with regards to systemic beliefs and practices regarding the image of women or a woman.

The creation and publication of the first feminist magazine were published in 1972. Ms Magazine was the first national magazine to make feminist voices prominent, make feminist ideas and beliefs available to the public, and support the works of feminist artists. Like the art world, the magazine used the media to spread the messages of feminism and draw attention to the lack of total gender equality in society. The co-founder of the magazine, Gloria Steinem, coined the famous quote, "A woman needs a man like a fish needs a bicycle", which demonstrates the power of independent women; this slogan was frequently used by activists.

Effect of feminist art on society
Lucy R. Lippard argued in 1980 that feminist art was "neither a style nor a movement but instead a value system, a revolutionary strategy, a way of life." This quote supports that feminist art affected all aspects of life. The women of the nation were determined to have their voices heard above the din of discontent, and equality would enable them to obtain jobs equal to men and gain rights and agency to their own bodies. Art was a form of media that was used to get the message across; this was their platform. Feminist art supports this claim because the art began to challenge previously conceived notions of the roles of women. The message of gender equality in feminist artworks resonates with the viewers because the challenging of the social norms made people question, should it be socially acceptable for women to wear men's clothing?

Example of feminist art
The magazine and the rise of feminism occurred during the same time feminist artists became more popular, and an example of a feminist artist is Judy Dater. Starting her artistic career in San Francisco, a cultural hub of different kinds of art and creative works, Dater displayed feminist photographs in museums and gained a fair amount of publicity for her work. Dater displayed art that focused on women challenging stereotypical gender roles, such as the expected way women would dress or pose for a photograph. To see a woman dressed in men's clothing was rare and made the statement of supporting the feminist movement, and many people knew of Dater's passionate belief of equal rights. Dater also photographed nude women, which was intended to show women's bodies as strong, powerful, and as a celebration. The photographs grabbed the viewers attention because of the unusualness and never-before-seen images that do not necessarily fit into society.

Gallery

See also

 Cyberfeminism
 Feminist art movement
 Feminist art movement in the United States
 List of feminist artists
 Postmodern feminism
 Women Artists of Bangladesh
 Women in photography
 Women Surrealists
 French women artists
 British women artists

Notes

References

Further reading
 
 Connie Butler (2007). WACK! Art and the Feminist Revolution. The MIT Press. 
 Heartney, E., Posner, H., Princenthal, N., & Scott, S. (2013). After the revolution: women who transformed contemporary art. Prestel Verlag.
 Bettina Papenberg, Marta Zarzycka (eds.) (2017). Carnal Aesthetics: transgressive imagery and feminist politics. I.B.Tauris.
 Griselda Pollock (ed.) (2013). Visual Politics of Pychoanalysis. I.B.Tauris 
 Griselda Pollock (1996). Generations and Geographies in the Visual Arts: Feminist Reading. London and NY: Routledge 
 Liz Rideal and Kathleen Soriano (2018). (Madame & Eve. Women Portraying Women. 
 Jenni Sorkin and Linda Theung, "Selected Chronology of All-Women Group Exhibitions, 1943-1983," in Wack!: Art and the Feminist Revolution. Los Angeles: The Museum of Contemporary Art, 2007. Print.
Catherine de Zegher (2015). Women's Work is Never Done. Ghent: Mer. Papers Kunsthalle.

 
Contemporary art
 Feminist artists
 Feminist theatre
 Feminist theory
 Political art